Masque is a form of festive courtly entertainment which flourished in 16th- and early 17th-century Europe.

Masque or Masques may also refer to:

 Masquerade ball, an event which the participants attend in costume wearing a mask

Books
 Masque, a novel by F. Paul Wilson
 Masque (comics), a fictional character from Marvel Comics' X-Men

Film and TV
 Masques (film), a 1987 French film

Music

Classical
Masques (Debussy) (1904)
Masques (Szymanowski), a 1915-16 piano work
 Masque, W. Francis McBeth (1967)

Bands
 Masque (band), a 1980s American metal band
 Masque (Canadian band), moniker used by the band CANO for a single 1981 album
 Masque, Vernon Reid's backing band

Albums
 Masque (Kansas album) (1975)
 Masque (King Crimson album) (1999)
 Masque (Manfred Mann's Earth Band album) (1987)
 Masque (The Mission album) (1992)
 Masques (Brand X album)

Others
 The Masque (venue), a short-lived Hollywood underground music venue that was instrumental in the Los Angeles punk rock scene
 Masque Attack, an iOS vulnerability disclosed by FireEye in 2014
 Masques block, a block of card expansions for the trading card game Magic: The Gathering

See also
 Mask (disambiguation)
 Masquerade (disambiguation)